Murrumbidgee Regional High School is a dual-campus government-funded co-educational comprehensive secondary day school located in Griffith, a city in the Riverina region of New South Wales, Australia. 

Established in 2019 through the merger of Griffith High School and Wade High School, the former schools enrolled approximately 1,250 students in 2018, from Year 7 to Year 12, of whom eleven percent identified as Indigenous Australians and 26 percent were from a language background other than English. The school is operated by the NSW Department of Education; the principal is David Crelley.

See also 

 List of government schools in New South Wales
 List of schools in the Riverina
 Education in Australia

References

External links 
 

Educational institutions established in 2019
Public high schools in New South Wales
Griffith, New South Wales
2019 establishments in Australia
Education in the Riverina